Edwin González may refer to:
Edwin González (Guatemalan footballer) (born 1982)
Edwin González (Salvadoran footballer) (born 1977)